Assarih; is a Tunisian daily in Arabic founded on 3 January 1995 by Salah El Hajja. It became a daily from 2 October 2002 and ceased to appear in print on 2 April 2018 while remaining active on the Internet.

References

External links
  Assarih

Newspapers established in 1995
Mass media in Tunis
1987 establishments in Tunisia
Defunct newspapers published in Tunisia
Arabic-language newspapers
Publications disestablished in 2018
Online newspapers with defunct print editions